Seokchon is an interchange station on Line 8 and Line 9 of the Seoul Metropolitan Subway, located near Seokchon Lake Park. Originally a station along Line 8 only, it became a transfer station when an extension of Line 9 opened on 1 December 2018.

Entrance
 Exit 1 : Way to Jamsil, Seokchon Lake
 Exit 2 : Songpa 1 dong
 Exit 3 : Town office of Songpa 1 dong, Songpa 1 police office.

Station layout

Line 8

Line 9

Gallery

References

Metro stations in Songpa District
Railway stations opened in 1996
Seoul Metropolitan Subway stations